The Case of Jennie Brice is a crime novel by the American writer Mary Roberts Rinehart (1876–1956) set in 1904 in Allegheny, Pennsylvania, which has been a part of the city of Pittsburgh since 1907.

Plot
A blood-stained rope, and towel, and a missing tenant, Jenny Brice—all of which convince Mrs. Pittman that a murder has been committed in her boarding house. But without a body, the police say there is no case. Pittman tries to ferret out the killer by using the key to Jennie's apartment to investigate.

References

External links

 
Mary Roberts Rinehart Papers, 1831-1970, SC.1958.03, Special Collections Department, University of Pittsburgh

1913 American novels
American crime novels
Fiction set in 1904
Novels set in the 1900s
Novels set in Pittsburgh
Works by Mary Roberts Rinehart
Bobbs-Merrill Company books